Blue is the debut studio album by British DJ Jonas Blue, released on 11 November 2018, via Positiva and Virgin EMI.

Background
The album consists of most of Blue's previous released singles including "Rise" with American duo Jack & Jack, "Polaroid" with English musician Liam Payne and double platinum-certified single "Fast Car" alongside seven new original tracks such as "Wherever You Go" and "Come Through". It features collaborators such as Canadian-Colombian singer-songwriter Jessie Reyez, American pop singer Joe Jonas, Scottish vocalist Nina Nesbitt, English songwriter Chelcee Grimes, Argentine singer TINI and Kosovar singer Era Istrefi.

Idolator described the album as a "greatest hits collection". Blue stated on his Instagram page that "Hey guys, super excited to announce the release of my debut album BLUE – coming out November 9th. Includes all the hits plus 7 new tracks with some amazing new artists." He told the Evening Standard that he "wanted to explore new talent and there's established acts and other people but it's been great to have the new up-and-coming talent on this".

Track listing
Track listing adapted from iTunes.

Charts

Weekly charts

Year-end charts

Certifications

References

2018 debut albums
Jonas Blue albums
Positiva Records albums
Virgin EMI Records albums
Albums produced by Jordan Riley